Nikola Eskić (born 19 December 1997) is a Bosnian footballer who plays as a midfielder for Kazakh club Aksu

Club career
As a youth player, Eskić joined FK Vlasenica from football club Milići in summer 2014. He was playing with FK Vlasenica in the first half of the 2015–16 First League of Republika Srpska. In the winter-break, he had 6 goals scored in the league and he became member of the youth team of the Republika Srpska official football team, and as such, he moved to Zvijezda 09.

He played with Zvijezda 09 in the first half of the 2016–17 First League of Republika Srpska (14 appearances, Bosnian second-level. During winter-break, he joined Serbian team FK Napredak Kruševac.

International career
On 17 May 2018 he received a call for the Bosnia and Herzegovina national under-21 football team. and he debuted in a friendly game against Albania played on 28 May 2018, a 2–0 away win.

References

1997 births
Living people
People from Bijeljina
Association football midfielders
Bosnia and Herzegovina footballers
Bosnia and Herzegovina under-21 international footballers
FK Vlasenica players
FK Zvijezda 09 players
FK Napredak Kruševac players
OFK Bačka players
FK Bregalnica Štip players
First League of the Republika Srpska players
Serbian SuperLiga players
Macedonian First Football League players
Bosnia and Herzegovina expatriate footballers
Expatriate footballers in Serbia
Bosnia and Herzegovina expatriate sportspeople in Serbia
Expatriate footballers in North Macedonia
Bosnia and Herzegovina expatriate sportspeople in North Macedonia